Carroll County Community College is a two-year community college serving the residents of Carroll County, Maryland, United States.

Notable alumni
Justin Ready, (born 1982), member of the Maryland State Senate and former member of the Maryland House of Delegates

External links
Carroll Community College website

1976 establishments in Maryland
Community and junior colleges in Maryland
Two-year colleges in the United States
Universities and colleges in Carroll County, Maryland
Westminster, Maryland